Taylor Township is one of twenty townships in Benton County, Iowa, USA.  As of the 2000 census, its population was 781.

History
Taylor Township was founded in 1846.

Geography
According to the United States Census Bureau, Taylor Township covers an area of 36.7 square miles (95.04 square kilometers); of this, 36.13 square miles (93.59 square kilometers, 98.47 percent) is land and 0.56 square miles (1.46 square kilometers, 1.54 percent) is water.

The city of Vinton is entirely within this township geographically but is a separate entity.

Adjacent townships
 Harrison Township (north)
 Polk Township (northeast)
 Benton Township (east)
 Canton Township (southeast)
 Eden Township (south)
 Big Grove Township (southwest)
 Jackson Township (west)
 Vinton Township (west)
 Cedar Township (northwest)

Cemeteries
The township contains these five cemeteries: Maplewood, Pettit Hill, Plum Grove, Saint Marys and United Brethren.

Major highways
  U.S. Route 218
  Iowa Highway 150

Airports and landing strips
 Vinton Veterans Memorial Airpark

School districts
 Vinton-Shellsburg Community School District

Political districts
 Iowa's 3rd congressional district
 State House District 39
 State Senate District 20

References
 United States Census Bureau 2007 TIGER/Line Shapefiles
 United States Board on Geographic Names (GNIS)
 United States National Atlas

External links

 
US-Counties.com
City-Data.com

Townships in Benton County, Iowa
Cedar Rapids, Iowa metropolitan area
Townships in Iowa
1846 establishments in Iowa Territory